Safranbolulu Izzet Mehmet Pasha (1743 – 18 September 1812) was a grand vizier of the Ottoman Empire and served from 1794 to 1798.

Izzet Mehmet Pasha was born in Safranbolu (today in Karabük Province, Turkey). His uncle was Kapudan Pasha (grand admiral) . Izzet Mehmed Pasha came to Istanbul in 1759/60 to work with him. In 1778, he married Halil Hamid Pasha's daughter, becoming his son-in-law.

He then served as the Ottoman governor of Jeddah (1787–1790), Morea (1790–1791), and Egypt (May 1791 – September 1794).

On 19 October 1794, he was appointed grand vizier by sultan Selim III. He was dismissed on 30 August 1798 and exiled to Chios (now a Greek island), and then to Manisa. He died in Manisa on 19 September 1812.

Legacy
Izzet Mehmet commissioned a watchtower in 1797 and a mosque in 1798 in his hometown of Safranbolu (see İzzet Mehmet Pasha Mosque).

See also
 List of Ottoman Grand Viziers
 List of Ottoman governors of Egypt

References

1743 births
1812 deaths
18th-century Ottoman governors of Egypt
18th-century Grand Viziers of the Ottoman Empire
Pashas
Turks from the Ottoman Empire
People from Safranbolu
Ottoman governors of Egypt